Kukk is a common Estonian surname, translated as "rooster, cock". It may refer to:
Aino Kukk (1930–2006), chess player
Alfred Kukk (1906–1981), sport shooter
Artur Kukk (1889–1958), speed skater, wrestler and boxer
August Kukk (1908–1988), wrestler
Erich Kukk (1928–2017), phycologist and conservationist
Ille Kukk (born 1957), track and field athlete
Jakob Kukk (1870–1933), clergyman
Juhan Kukk (1885–1942), politician and entrepreneur
Jüri Kukk (1940–1981), chemist and Soviet dissident
Kalev Kukk (born 1951), geographer and politician
Leonhard Kukk (1906–1944), weightlifter
Martin Kukk (born 1987), politician 
Mihkel Kukk (born 1983), javelin thrower
Sigvard Kukk (born 1972), cyclist
Tõnu-Reid Kukk (born 1939), politician
Toomas Kukk (born 1971), botanist
Ülle Kukk (born 1937), botanist

References

Estonian-language surnames